Ulla Margit Rantala (born 1 May 1957 in Tammela) is a Finnish archer.

Career

She competed at the World Archery Championships in 1981 and 1983. In 1981 she finished eighth in the team event and 49th in the individual event. Two years later Rantala came 45th individually.

At the 1984 Summer Olympic Games she came 15th with 2460 points in the women's individual event.

References

External links 
 Profile on worldarchery.org

1957 births
Living people
Finnish female archers
Olympic archers of Finland
Archers at the 1984 Summer Olympics
People from Tammela, Finland
Sportspeople from Kanta-Häme